Trust Us, We're Experts: How Industry Manipulates Science and Gambles with Your Future is a book written by Sheldon Rampton and John Stauber. It is published by Jeremy P. Tarcher Inc. of the Penguin Group. The book focuses on the role experts hired by public relations firms play in quieting public fear with inaccurate or incomplete information when dangerous toxins from industrial processes are released into the environment.

An April 2001, Village Voice's review of the book says the book is "exhaustively detailed", "calmly convincing", and "light on rhetoric", warning readers that the book may induce "paranoid fatalism" about corporate manipulations. Bill Moyers of PBS said "If you want to know how the world wags, and who's wagging it, here's your answer. Read, get mad, roll up your sleeves, and fight back. Rampton and Stauber have issued a wake-up call we can't ignore."

See also 
 Mark Diesendorf
 Sheldon Krimsky

References

External links 
 Official webpage

Marketing books
Public relations
TarcherPerigee books
2001 non-fiction books